Gudangaay Tlaats'gaa Naay Secondary, formerly George M Dawson Secondary School, is a public high school in Masset, British Columbia.  It is one of two secondary schools and one of six schools in School District 50 Haida Gwaii.   George Mercer Dawson Secondary officially opened on October 19, 1970, and was named after George Mercer Dawson, (August 1, 1849 – March 2, 1901) a Canadian scientist, surveyor and eminent authority on ethnology and archeology who undertook the Canadian Governments Geological Survey of Haida Gwaii, formerly named Queen Charlotte Islands.  In September, 2016 the school was renamed to Gudangaay Tlaats'gaa Naay Secondary by unanimous decision of the SD50 School Board.

Some internationally renowned Haida Artists such as Robert Davidson, Reginald Davidson and Jim Hart attended Masset High School prior to its renaming.

References

"Student Headcount by Grade." Education Analytics, Government of BC. n.d. Web. Accessed 5 Apr. 2021 from: https://catalogue.data.gov.bc.ca/dataset/bc-schools-student-headcount-by-grade/resource/c1a55945-8554-4058-9019-514b16178f89 (Line 81333)

External links
BC Ministry of Education school information.
School District 50 Haida Gwaii list of schools.

High schools in British Columbia
Educational institutions in Canada with year of establishment missing
1970 establishments in British Columbia